The P-Funk Earth Tour was a concert tour by Parliament-Funkadelic in 1976-1977, featuring absurd costumes, lavish staging and special effects, and music from both the Parliament and Funkadelic repertoires.

The P-Funk Earth Tour was ambitious from the start. Casablanca Records executive Neil Bogart gave George Clinton a $275,000 budget for production, the largest amount ever allocated for a Black music act to tour.  Clinton hired Jules Fischer as set designer, who had previously worked on tours for The Rolling Stones, KISS, and other rock bands.  Both the show's music and production elements were extensively rehearsed at an aircraft hangar in Newburgh, New York.  The show required seven trucks to transport its equipment and scenery. With a broad range of themes embodied in the show's production, culminating in the Afrofuturist landing of the P-Funk Mothership, author Rickey Vincent states that the P-Funk Earth Tour "drew from the ribald, uncensored entirety of the Black tradition in mind-blowing ways no one had yet even attempted."  Rolling Stone viewed the tour as embracing Clinton's "semiserious funk mythology" with "[a] mixture of tribal funk, elaborate stage props and the relentless assault on personal inhibition [that] resembled nothing so much as a Space Age Mardi Gras."  The New York Times described the tour as featuring "superbly silly, lavish costumes" and an "opulent Baroque ... stage show".

The tour began in April 1976 in Nashville.
The 1977 live album Live: P-Funk Earth Tour was recorded at two early 1977 concerts, January 19 at the Los Angeles Forum and January 21 at the Oakland Coliseum.
The tour drew to a close in mid-1977; its expenses were as high as its innovation level and it was losing money steadily; indeed one tour assistant's job was "to tell the musicians why they weren't getting paid."  Nevertheless, the tour served as valuable publicity and marketing for "the P-Funk brand", making reference to the greater Parliament-Funkadelic-Clinton enterprise of acts, records, side projects, spin-offs, and so forth.

References

External links
 P-Funk Tour List

Earth Tour
1977 concert tours